The imine Diels–Alder reaction involves the transformation of all-carbon dienes and imine dienophiles into
tetrahydropyridines.

Introduction
Imines may be employed as dienophiles in hetero-Diels-Alder reactions. These reactions involve the lowest unoccupied molecular orbital (LUMO) of the imine, meaning that imines substituted with electron-withdrawing groups on nitrogen are
the most reactive. The reaction may be thermal, in refluxing solvents such as benzene or others typical for Diels–Alder reactions, or acid catalyzed, again using common Diels–Alder Lewis acids such as boron trifluoride or zinc chloride. It may proceed via a concerted, [4+2]
cycloaddition mechanism, although in cases of extreme polarization, addition to the imine followed by
nitrogen nucleophilic attack (the "Mannich-Michael" pathway) occurs. Cyclic, acyclic, and tethered imines have all been employed in the reaction with success.
(1) Simple alkyl or aryl amines are often generated in situ by combining an amine hydrochloride with an aldehyde.

Mechanism and stereochemistry

Prevailing mechanism
The imino Diels-Alder (IDA) reaction may occur either by a concerted or stepwise process. The lowest-energy
transition state for the concerted process places the imine lone pair (or coordinated Lewis acid) in an exo
position. Thus, (E) imines, in which the lone pair and larger imine carbon substituent are cis, tend to give exo products.
(2)
When the imine nitrogen is protonated or coordinated to a strong Lewis acid, the mechanism shifts to a stepwise, Mannich-Michael pathway.
(3)
Whatever the mechanism, the transition state of cyclization is highly polarized. Thus, the regiochemistry of
cycloaddition can be predicted by considering the electron-withdrawing or -donating nature of substituents
on the diene. The carbon bearing the largest coefficient in the HOMO of the diene forms a bond to the imine carbon.
(4)

Stereoselective variants
In many cases, cyclic dienes give higher diastereoselectivities than acyclic dienes. Use of amino-acid-based chiral auxiliaries, for instance, leads to good diastereoselectivities in reactions of cyclopentadiene, but not in reactions of acyclic dienes.
(6)
Chiral auxiliaries have been employed on either the imino nitrogen or imino carbon to effect diastereoselection.
(5)

Scope and limitations
Attaching an electron-withdrawing group to the imine nitrogen increases the reactivity of the imine. The exo isomer
usually predominates (particularly when cyclic dienes are used), although selectivities vary.
(7)
Tosylimines may be generated in situ from tosylisocyanate and aldehydes. Cycloadditions of
these intermediates with dienes give single constitutional isomers, but proceed with moderate stereoselectivity.
(8)
Lewis-acid catalyzed reactions of sulfonyl imines also exhibit moderate stereoselectivity.
(9)
Simple unactivated imines react with hydrocarbon dienes only with the help of a Lewis acid; however, both electron-rich
and electron-poor dienes react with unactivated imines when heated. Vinylketenes, for instance, afford dihydropyridones upon [4+2] cycloaddition with imines. Regio- and stereoselectivity are unusually high in reactions of this class of dienes.
(10)
Vinylallenes react similarly in the presence of a Lewis acid, often with high diastereoselectivity.
(11)

Synthetic applications
The IDA reaction has been applied to the synthesis of a number of alkaloid natural products. In this example, Danishefsky's diene is used to form a six-membered ring en route to phyllanthine.
(12)

Comparison with other methods
Several other methods can access the 1,2,5,6-tetrahydropyridine ring system afforded by
IDA reactions. Partial reduction of pyridinium salts has been used, although regioselectivity issues arise when substituted pyridiniums are used.
(13)
A modified Ireland-Claisen rearrangement leads to tetrahydropyridines via a silyl ketene acetal intermediate.
(14)
Ring-closing olefin metathesis has also been used to establish the tetrahydropyridine ring system.
(15)

See also
 Oxo Diels–Alder reaction
 Aza-Diels–Alder reaction

References

Name reactions
Cycloadditions